Kyra Dickinson (born 3 January 1993) is a footballer who plays as a goalkeeper for ProStars FC in League1 Ontario. Born in Canada, she represents the Saint Kitts and Nevis women's national team.

Early life
Dickinson played youth soccer with Brampton Brams United and Master's FA.

College career
Dickinson began attending Howard University in 2011, where she played for the women's soccer team. In 2014, she was Howard's Goalkeeper of the Year, and was also named the SWAC Goalkeeper of the Year and named to the SWAC All-Conference Second Team, winning the 2014 SWAC Soccer Tournament Championship.

After graduating from Howard, she pursued a masters degree at the University of British Columbia, where she also played at the amateur level in the Metro Women’s Soccer League Premier Division in Vancouver with the Vancouver United FC Primas.

Playing career
In 2017, she played in Sweden with Töcksfors IF.

In 2021, she played with Master's FA.

In 2022, she joined ProStars FC in League1 Ontario.

International career
Internationally, Dickinson represents St. Kitts and Nevis, serving as vice-captain and later as captain.

References

External links

1993 births
Living people
Citizens of Saint Kitts and Nevis through descent
Saint Kitts and Nevis women's footballers
Women's association football goalkeepers
Howard Bison women's soccer players
Saint Kitts and Nevis women's international footballers
Saint Kitts and Nevis expatriate women's footballers
Saint Kitts and Nevis expatriate sportspeople in the United States
Expatriate women's soccer players in the United States
People from Lanaudière
Soccer people from Quebec
Soccer players from Brampton
Canadian women's soccer players
Black Canadian women's soccer players
Canadian people of Saint Kitts and Nevis descent
Sportspeople of Saint Kitts and Nevis descent
Canadian expatriate women's soccer players
Canadian expatriate sportspeople in the United States
Master's FA players
ProStars FC players
League1 Ontario (women) players